The year 2013 is the 3rd year in the history of the ONE Championship, a mixed martial arts promotion based in Singapore.

Tournament bracket

Bantamweight Grand Prix

ONE Bantamweight Grand Prix bracket
{{4TeamBracket | RD1=Semi-finals| RD2=Final

| RD1-seed1=
| RD1-seed2=
| RD1-team1= Kevin Belingon
| RD1-score1= TKO 
| RD1-team2= Thanh Vu
| RD1-score2= 2r. 

| RD1-seed3= 
| RD1-seed4=
| RD1-team3= Masakatsu Ueda 
| RD1-score3= SUB 
| RD1-team4= Jens Pulver 
| RD1-score4= 2r. 

| RD2-seed1=
| RD2-team1= Kevin Belingon   
| RD2-score1= 3r.
| RD2-team2= Masakatsu Ueda 
| RD2-score2= UD}}

Malaysia Featherweight Tournament 

ONE Malaysia Featherweight Tournament bracket

1Jian Kai Chee was forced to pull out of his bout with Yeoh due to injury and could not participate in the finals of the Grand Prix. He was subsequently replaced by AJ Lias Mansor.

List of events

ONE Fighting Championship: Return of WarriorsONE Fighting Championship: Return of Warriors (also known as ONE FC 7) was a mixed martial arts event held by ONE Championship. The event took place on February 2, 2013 at the 16,000 capacity Putra Indoor Stadium in Kuala Lumpur, Malaysia.

Background
The event crowned the first ONE Featherweight Champion, in a matchup originally scheduled for ONE FC: Rise of Kings, between Philippine fighters Eric Kelly and Honorio Banario, which was scratched at that time due to PPV time constraints.

The event also held the first two bouts of the 4-man ONE Malaysian National Featherweight Championship Tournament and the final first-round bout of the ONE Bantamweight Grand Prix.

Results

ONE Fighting Championship: Kings and ChampionsONE Fighting Championship: Kings and Champions (also known as ONE FC 8) was a mixed martial arts event held by ONE Championship. The event took place on April 5, 2013 at the 12,000 capacity Singapore Indoor Stadium in Kallang, Singapore.

Background
This event held the first title defense for ONE Lightweight Champion Kotetsu Boku against Japanese top contender Shinya Aoki. The event  also marked the return of fighters like Melvin Manhoef, Leandro Issa and Jake Butler to the ONE cage, and the two semifinals of the ONE Bantamweight Grand Prix.

Results

ONE Fighting Championship: Rise to PowerONE Fighting Championship: Rise to Power (also known as ONE FC 9) was a mixed martial arts event held by ONE Championship. The event took place on May 31, 2013 at the 20,000 capacity SM Mall of Asia Arena in Pasay, Philippines.

Background
This was the second visit of ONE to the Philippines, after the successful August 2012 event held at the Araneta Coliseum.

The event held the first title defense for ONE Featherweight Champion Honorio Banario against Japanese contender Koji Oishi. The original matchup for the title was against Korean top contender Bae Young Kwon, but was scrapped due to the Kwon commitment with the local military service.

Results

ONE Fighting Championship: Champions & WarriorsONE Fighting Championship: Champions & Warriors (also known as ONE FC 10) was a mixed martial arts event held by ONE Championship. The event took place on September 13, 2013 at the 10,000 capacity Istora Senayan in Jakarta, Indonesia.

 Background
This event marked the second visit of ONE to Indonesia, after the February 2012 event held at the BritAma Arena.

Yasuhiro Urushitani was scheduled to face Shinichi Kojima in the main event for the inaugural ONE Flyweight Championship but had to pull out due to an injury and was replaced by Andrew Leone. Although on September 10, 2013 Leone also pulled out of the title bout and the fight was scrapped all together.

 Results

ONE Fighting Championship: Total DominationONE Fighting Championship: Total Domination (also known as ONE FC 11) was a mixed martial arts event held by ONE Championship. The event took place on October 18, 2013 at the Singapore Indoor Stadium in Kallang, Singapore.

 Background

The main event was a unification bout for the ONE bantamweight world title between champion Soo Chul Kim and interim champion Bibiano Fernandes.

The Co-Main event featured ONE's Lightweight Champion Shinya Aoki dropping a division to compete in a non-title fight against Cody Stevens.

On October 19, 2013, ONE officials deemed the Flyweight bout between Rene Catalan and Khim Dima a No Contest due to several illegal strikes perceived during a review of the fight.

 Results

ONE Fighting Championship: Warrior SpiritONE Fighting Championship: Warrior Spirit (also known as ONE FC 12) was a mixed martial arts event held by ONE Championship. The event took place on November 15, 2013 at the Putra Indoor Stadium in Bukit Jalil, Kuala Lumpur, Malaysia.

 Background

The main event was going to be a contest for the inaugural ONE Welterweight Championship between Adam Kayoom and Nobutatsu Suzuki. On November 11, 2013, ONE officials announced that Adam Kayoom was injured, and was going to be replaced by Vitor Pinto. However, Pinto was not medically cleared and the bout was cancelled.

 Results

ONE Fighting Championship: Moment of TruthONE Fighting Championship: Moment of Truth (also known as ONE FC 13''') was a mixed martial arts event held by ONE Championship. The event took place on December 6, 2013 at the SM Mall of Asia Arena in Pasay, Philippines

 Background

The main event was a rematch for the ONE Featherweight world title between champion Koji Oishi and former champion Honorio Banario.

The event also featured the return of local favorites Eduard Folayang and Geje Eustaquio.

 Results

See also
 2013 in UFC
 2013 in Konfrontacja Sztuk Walki
 2013 in Road FC

References

External links
ONE Championship

ONE Championship events
ONE Championship events
2013 in mixed martial arts
2013 in kickboxing
2013-related lists